Avalanche is a 1994 CTV Fox  made-for-television disaster action thriller film directed by Paul Shapiro and starring Michael Gross, Deanna Milligan, Myles Ferguson and David Hasselhoff. The film was shot in British Columbia, Canada.

Premise
A father (Gross) and his two children (Milligan, Ferguson) take a trip up to a log cabin in the mountains. Duncan (Hasselhoff) is a diamonds smuggler who unintentionally crashes his plane causing an avalanche that traps the family inside their cabin. He is rescued by the family. While they are trying to dig their way out to freedom, he instead aggressively forces them to search for the diamonds he had smuggled from Russia.

Critical reception
In his Variety review, critic Tony Scott called Avalanche "a solid thriller", highlighting the "stunning" camerawork, editing and the musical score. However, AllMovie's Bernadette McCallion was less enthusiastic and only gave the film 2 out of 5 stars.

Cast
 Michael Gross as Brian Kemp
 Deanna Milligan as Deidre Kemp
 Myles Ferguson as Max Kemp
 David Hasselhoff as Duncan Snyder
 Don S. Davis as Whitney
 George Josef as Major
 Ben Cardinal as Hunter

References

External links
 
 

1994 television films
1990s disaster films
1990s thriller drama films
1994 action thriller films
Alliance Atlantis films
Canadian disaster films
American thriller drama films
CTV Television Network original programming
Fox Broadcasting Company original programming
Disaster television films
English-language Canadian films
Films about criminals
Films about families
Films shot in British Columbia
Survival films
Canadian thriller television films
Action television films
1994 drama films
1994 films
Avalanches in film
American drama television films
1990s American films
1990s Canadian films